"Bulletproof" is a song by American rock band Godsmack. It was the first single off of their seventh studio album When Legends Rise.

Background
The song was first released on February 28, 2018. as the first single from their seventh studio album When Legends Rise. The song is the band's first release since switching record labels from Universal Republic to BMG in 2016 for more artistic control over their music. Their prior single, a cover of the Beatles' "Come Together" was released as a single in 2017, but this was because it originated from the band's 2012 release Live & Inspired.

Themes and composition
Lyrically, the song, along with its respective album, are related to the band still being together and functioning well as a unit for over twenty years. Frontman Sully Erna said of writing the song: 

Musically, the song was described as more melodic and catchy, and less aggressive, than the band's past music. Loudwire described it as having a "subdued vibe" in the choruses, with layers of guitar added gradually, until it "explodes" into the chorus, with heavy distorted guitars and melodic, soaring vocals.

Track listing
Digital single

Music video
The music video for "Bulletproof" was released in April 3, 2018. It features guest appearances by Billy Ray Cyrus and Sebastian Bach. The 10 minute video was created by director Troy Smith and producer/editor Noah Berlow. The clip follows the band as they "audition" different directors to make their new music video, only to settle on Sully Erna's "cousin from Italy," Salvatore Pasquale. When asked about the making of the "Bulletproof" music video and the band's decision to take a comedic approach, Erna stated that "We just really enjoy having fun and laughing," adding, "Music is about entertainment just as much as it's about the art."

Reception

Critical
Reaction to the song has been mixed. Metal Injection sees the song as a "departure" for the band, instead opting for a "more melodic/catchy sound". MetalSucks however was critical of the new sound demonstrated by the song, comparing it to 3 Doors Down and pop music.

Commercial
Upon its release, "Bulletproof" entered multiple charts, including the Billboard Mainstream Rock Songs. The single debuted at number 24, making it the highest debut and greatest gainer in charting for the week. The single ultimately peaked at number one where it remained for five consecutive weeks, giving Godsmack their eighth number one single on that chart. When asked about the single's chart performance, Sully Erna admitted that, despite "Bulletproof" being "the most commercial song on the record", he was still pleased to see the fans embrace it. The single was certified platinum by the RIAA on September 24, 2020 for accumulating 1 million certified units, almost a year after it was certified gold for accumulating 500,000 certified units. In addition to it being certified platinum, "Bulletproof" was the most-played song on rock radio in 2018.

Personnel
Band

 Sully Erna – vocals, rhythm guitar 
 Tony Rombola – lead guitar
 Robbie Merrill – bass
 Shannon Larkin – drums

Charts

Weekly charts

Year-end charts

Certifications

References

2018 singles
2018 songs
Godsmack songs
Songs written by Sully Erna
Songs written by Erik Ron